The Santa Rita Fault is a strike-slip fault in the department of Antioquia in northern Colombia.

Etymology 
The fault is named after Santa Rita de Ituango.

Description 
The Santa Rita Fault displaces metamorphosed volcanic and sedimentary rocks through most of its length; in the northern part, the fault places Cretaceous basic volcanic rocks against Tertiary and Quaternary sedimentary rocks. To the south, the Santa Rita Fault intercepts the Espíritu Santo Fault. The fault has a well-defined fault trace seen on satellite images. The trace is characterized by linear valleys, strong breaks in slope, offset alluvial fans and colluvial deposits, and local subsidence of the soil. The Santa Rita Fault might be the source of a historic magnitude 4.8 earthquake.

See also 

 List of earthquakes in Colombia
 Romeral Fault System

References

Bibliography

Maps

Further reading 
 

Seismic faults of Colombia
Strike-slip faults
Active faults
Faults
Earthquakes in Colombia